The following is a discography of American country music singer-songwriter Eddie Rabbitt.

Studio albums

1970s

1980s

1990s

Compilation albums

Singles

1960s and 1970s

1980s

1990s

Music videos

References

External links

Rabbitt, Eddie
Discographies of American artists